Blatcherism is a term formed as a portmanteau of the names of two British politicians, Tony Blair (Labour Party) and Margaret Thatcher (Conservative Party). It has been used by critics of monetarism and economic liberalism to refer to the thesis that a policy model of the Thatcher government, distinct from one-nation conservatism, was resurrected when Blair came to power. It echoed "Butskellism", frequently used to describe the post-war consensus on a mixed economy with moderate state intervention to promote social goals, particularly in education and health.

Editorial comment by Red Pepper before the 1997 general election that brought Blair to power may be the earliest usage. Another early sighting of this term was in 2001, used by Brian Lee Crowley, a Canadian commentator. The term has also been used, for example, by the journalist Alexander Cockburn in preference to Blairism.

Definition 
Blatcherism can be defined as an emphasis on free market policies, support for Privatization or the private ownership of former public services, a monetarist/neo-classical economic policy and a retention of anti-trade union legislation. A convergence of such policies between the Labour and Conservative parties first emerged when Blair became leader of the Labour Party. Blair was elected Leader of the Labour Party in July 1994 following the sudden death of his predecessor, John Smith. Under Blair's leadership, the party abandoned many policies it had held for decades and embraced many of the measures enacted during Thatcher's tenure as Prime Minister, including the Building Societies (deregulation) Act of 1986. In conjunction with Peter Mandelson, Gordon Brown and Alastair Campbell, Blair created the New Labour ethos by embracing many aspects of Thatcherite beliefs into Labour as the "Third Way".

The term is also used as shorthand by Ye. V. Ananyeva (On Modern Ways of Reformism, or On Reformism as Modern Way, Polis Journal), according to whom Blatcherism is currently "personified by T. Blair", has "substituted for the previous postwar political consensus" and is "consensual" with "neoconservatism as embodied in Thatcherism" in the approach to a solution to Britain's modernisation problems.

References

External links 
 Chapter 10 of Government and Politics in Britain: An introduction by John Kingdom; page 25 of the PDF file contains the section From Butskillism to Blatcherism?
 On the spiral from Butskillism to Blatcherism, cause effect process and outcome

Economic history of the United Kingdom
Eponymous political ideologies
Politics of the United Kingdom
Margaret Thatcher
Tony Blair
Free market